Pefko may refer to:

Pefko, Messenia, a small village in Messenia, Greece
Nea Peramos, a suburb of Athens, Greece, formerly known as Megalo Pefko 
Pefkos, a beach resort near Rhodos, Greece
Pefkos, Crete, a village in Viannos municipality, Crete